Hyun Jyu-ni (born August 1, 1985), previously known under the stage names Juni or Ju-an, is a South Korean singer and actress.

Career
Hyun Jyu-ni debuted as the frontman of the four-member girl rock band BellaMafia, which released the album Overstep in 2008. TV director Lee Jae-kyoo spotted her in the musical Bandits and cast her as a flutist in his television series Beethoven Virus. Hyun had played the flute from a young age, and was previously a member of the Seoul Youth Chamber Orchestra. Since then she has transitioned to an acting career, appearing in supporting roles as a pregnant young girl from Yanbian in Take Off, a hacker in IRIS, a firefighter in Love 911, as well as a starring role as a rock-band vocalist in Sky and Ocean. One of her most high-profile roles was as a young single mother who joins the Comeback Madonna Band in I Am Legend.

In 2020, Hyun became the female lead actress for the first time in her career in the 120-episode SBS morning drama Mom Has an Affair. In 2021, she became one of the cast members for TVN's MAMADOL. On December 10, 2021, the first episode of Mama The Idol was aired on tvN. The show marked the return of legendary idols who are currently mothers.[1]On the January 14th, 2022, broadcast of Mama The Idol, the members competed for the position of main vocalist. In the end, Sunye had earned the main vocalist position.[2]On January 28, Mamadol then released their debut digital single "Mama The Idol"

Personal life
Hyun married an entrepreneur on December 13, 2012 in a private ceremony held in Guam. She gave birth to their first child, a son, on July 30, 2013.

Filmography

Television series

Film

Music video

Musical theatre

Discography

Awards 
2010 Asia Model Awards: Special Model Award – New Star

References

External links
Hyun Jyu-ni at BH Entertainment 

South Korean television actresses
South Korean film actresses
South Korean musical theatre actresses
1985 births
Living people